Albasheer Show (Arabic: البشير شو) is an Iraqi satirical news programme, created and hosted by Ahmed Albasheer. It currently airs weekly on DW's Arabic language channel, with episodes also posted onto YouTube. The show first premiered on 30 August 2014 and until 2017 aired intermittently on various Iraqi television channels. Pressure from the Iraqi Communications and Media Commission has meant that the show is no longer broadcast in Iraq, although citizens are able to access the programme online. By 2015 the show had a recorded audience of 19 million, over half of Iraq's total population, and the show and its host has been called among the most influential in the country, with it being cited as playing a major role in the 2019-2021 Iraqi protests.

Development and content 
Albasheer was born in Ramadi, Iraq, and worked for eight years as a political commentator on Iraq's state-owned television channels. In 2011, after being injured in a suicide bombing in which his friend was killed, Albasheer left Iraq and moved to Amman, Jordan, where he set up his own production company, Lagash, in 2012.

The show has been likened to other satirical news programmes including The Daily Show in the United States and Al Bernameg in Egypt. Albasheer Show draws its satire from new stories, political figures, and media organisations, and often criticises the ongoing issues of corruption, sectarianism, extremism and terrorism in Iraq. Typical episodes open with a monologue from Albasheer, followed by exchanges between him and one or more correspondents, who adopt absurd or exaggerated takes on current events, against Albasheer's straight man persona. The final segment is often devoted to an interview with a prominent personality; this has included actors, musicians, writers, and political figures.

Albasheer, whose father and brother were killed during the Iraq War, and who was himself kidnapped and tortured in 2005, has stated his experiences heavily influenced the shape and content of the show, commenting "instead of getting revenge with a weapon, I try to fix the situation so nobody has to go through the things I went through. Instead of turning violent... I see this as the best way to respond to all the killing".

List of episodes

Season 1

Season 1.5 (Season 2)

Season 3.2 (Season 3)

Season 4

Season 5

Season 6

Critical reception 

The popularity of Albasheer Show amongst Iraqi audiences has been attributed to both Albasheer's comedy, which includes utilising dark sarcasm, local stereotyping and sexual innuendos, alongside his relatability due to public recognition of losses he experienced, like many Iraqi citizens, during the Iraq War. Albasheer's outspoken nature, and in particular his holding the Iraqi government to account, has been cited as empowering many Iraqis to speak out in protest, and he and the show have been cited as major influences over ongoing protests in Iraq.

The show's content has led to threats being made to Albasheer, who no longer lives in Iraq. One consistent target for mockery on the show has been the Islamic State, which controlled the city of Mosul between 2014 and 2017, who made several death threats against Albasheer as a result. Attempts have also been made by various groups to ban the broadcast of the show; the Iraqi Communications and Media Commission successfully stopped Iraqi television channels from broadcasting the show, while in Albasheer's hometown of Ramadi, the show was criticised as being an "apostate" programme, meaning anyone found watching it could be flogged.

The government of Iraq has been critical of the content of Albasheer Show and launched a criminal prosecution against Albasheer for producing the programme, which led to him being imprisoned for four days and delaying the premiere of the third season. While the show continues to be broadcast into Iraq, multiple attempts have been made to attempt to block the programme, although more recently some Iraqi politicians have appeared as guests on the programme.

References

External links 

 Website
 Lagash media production

2014 Iraqi television series debuts
Iraqi comedy television series
Iraqi television shows
YouTube channels